State Road 520 (SR 520) is a  east–west state highway in central Florida, United States, connecting with SR 50 in the Orlando area with SR A1A in Cocoa Beach.

Route description

It runs from SR 50 in Orange County east of Bithlo, southeast across the Beachline Expressway (SR 528). It intersects with County Road 532 (CR 532) before crossing the St. Johns River into Brevard County. In that county it intersects SR 524 (the original approach to the Bennett Causeway) and SR 9 (Interstate 95, I-95), before entering Cocoa and intersecting SR 501, SR 519 and SR 5 (U.S. Route 1, US 1).  In Cocoa, SR 520 is known as King Street.  It then heads onto the Merritt Island Causeway, a series of bridges crossing the Indian River, Newfound Harbor and the Banana River. Between the Indian River and Newfound Harbor, it crosses through Merritt Island, intersecting SR 3.  East of the Banana River, SR 520 runs through Cocoa Beach, and heads towards its eastern terminus at SR A1A.

From 2002 to 2007, the Florida Department of Transportation (FDOT) widened the  stretch to four lanes. The stretch had garnered the nickname "Bloody 520" for the numerous fatalities that had occurred on this stretch.

History

SR 206 was legislated in 1931 to run from pre-1945 SR 4 (US 1) in Cocoa east across the Indian River to Merritt Island. There it would split, with one leg running south to Georgiana and the other north to Courtenay. (In 1937, both of these branches from Merritt Island became part of pre-1945 SR 219, later part of SR 3.)

A 1935 law extended SR 206 west to Orlando along the planned Cocoa–Orlando Highway, which used Lake Road in the Cocoa area. Plans made by the State Road Department would have taken it into Orlando on Curry Ford Road (also defined as part of pre-1945 SR 411 in 1939).

SR 70 was defined in 1933, running from SR 206 at Merritt Island east over the Banana River to pre-1945 SR 140 at Cocoa Beach. A branch would run north along the west side of the Banana River to connect with pre-1945 SR 219 at Orsino.

Finally, SR 418 was defined along the existing Taylor Creek Road, running from pre-1945 SR 22 at Christmas south to the Osceola County line, crossing the planned SR 206 about two-thirds of the way.

By the 1945 renumbering, only the sections of SR 206 and SR 70 east of Cocoa were completed. SR 520 was defined to use sections of SR 418, SR 206 and SR 70. It would begin at SR 50 (former SR 22) near Christmas and run southeast along the general alignment of SR 418, switching to SR 206 where its planned alignment crossed. (SR 418 south of that crossing later became SR 532.) From there it would take SR 206 to Merritt Island, and SR 70 the rest of the way to end at SR 1 (former SR 140).

The section west of Cocoa was built in the 1950s. It used very little of the existing Taylor Creek Road, instead being built further west, joining SR 50 much closer to Bithlo than Christmas. At some point, Alafaya Trail was taken over from SR 50 north past the University of Central Florida to downtown Oviedo. SR 520 was extended west on SR 50 and then north on Alafaya Trail, ending at SR 419 and SR 426 in Oviedo. In the 1980s, SR 520 was truncated back to SR 50, and Alafaya became an extension of SR 434.

Major intersections

Former State Road 520A

Until about 1980, a  spur from SR 520 to Lake Poinsett was designated State Road 520A by FDOT and its predecessor, the State Road Department. Known locally as Lake Poinsett Road, the former SR 520A is the sole access road to Poinsett Groves and Poinsett Shores. The northern end is an intersection with King Street just west of I-95 near Rockledge.

References

External links

Florida Route Log (SR 520)

State highways in Florida
State Roads in Brevard County, Florida
State Roads in Orange County, Florida